The Abergele rail disaster, which took place near Abergele, North Wales, in August 1868, was the worst railway disaster in Great Britain up till then.

The Irish Mail train was on its way from London to Holyhead, when a complicated shunting operation caused the derailment of a goods train at Llanddulas, the nearest sidings to Abergele, blocking the main line. In the confusion, a brake-van and six wagons loaded with paraffin were left uncoupled on a gradient leading down to Abergele, and a collision with other carriages caused it to run downhill into the path of the Irish Mail, exploding on impact.

Flames and smoke made rescue impossible, and 33 people died in the crash, some of them burned beyond recognition. The inquest blamed the two brakemen on the goods train, who had failed to secure the wagons individually, as well as the stationmaster at Llanddulas who was supervising the operation. The Board of Trade also strongly criticised the London and North Western Railway for poor practices.

Narrative

The Irish Mail 
On 20 August 1868, at 7.30 a.m., the London and North Western Railway's down day Irish Mail train left the LNWR's London terminus, Euston Station, for Holyhead. One of the railway's most powerful engines, Prince of Wales, hauled behind it a chief guard's van, a travelling post office (mail van and tender), a luggage van, four passenger carriages, and a second guard's van at the rear of the train. At 11.30 a.m. in Chester, four more passenger carriages were attached immediately behind the front guard's van; the train then set off for Holyhead, its next scheduled stop, via the North Wales Coast Line (Chester and Holyhead Railway). At about 12.39 p.m. the train passed through Abergele at about 40 miles per hour (~64 km/h). Following a late start from Euston, and a further slight delay in Chester, it was about 5 minutes late overall; by that time it should already have been 3 miles (5 km) further on and passing Llanddulas.

The goods train 
Ahead of it, a 'pick-up' goods train 43 wagons long had left Abergele at 12.15 p.m. on the same line; to clear the down line for the express, the goods train was to be put into sidings at Llanddulas until the express had passed.

At Llanddulas, there were two sidings (Llysfaen sidings), serving a lime quarry to the south of the line.  When the goods train reached them (about 12.25 pm), both were partly occupied by goods wagons ('cargo trucks', or freight cars) and consequently neither siding could take the entire goods train. Under the direction of the Llanddulas stationmaster, therefore, the brake van and last six wagons of the goods train were uncoupled and left on the main down line (protected by the distant signal for Llanddulas).  Rather than simply shunting the rest of the train into one of the sidings and returning for the odd six, a series of 'loose shunting' operations was embarked upon intended to put empty wagons (there were 26 in the train) into one of the sidings and accumulate a shorter train of loaded wagons on the main line ready to put into the other siding.

Runaway wagons 
There were two brakesmen on the goods train; however, both men dismounted to take part in the shunting operations. The wagons did not have their own brakes applied, and so were held solely by the brake van – on a gradient of as much as 1 in 100, falling towards Abergele. The next set of loaded wagons were 'loose shunted' into the original wagons with such force as to jostle the brake van and release its own unsecured brake, and the wagons moved off in the direction of Abergele. The brake van was unoccupied, and no-one was able to catch up with it in order to board it and reapply the brake; the runaway wagons disappeared out of sight around a curve in the line. The next thought was to reverse the engine towards Abergele and retrieve the wagons, but this intention was quickly overtaken by the succeeding events.

Collision
About  beyond Abergele, Arthur Thompson, the engine driver of the Irish Mail, saw some wagons no more than 200 yards (~200 metres) in front, emerging from around a curve in the steep cutting at that point. He initially thought the wagons were on the up line, "but immediately afterwards perceived that they were running towards him on the down line on which he was travelling". He promptly shut off steam, and the fireman, who had also seen the hazard, applied his brake. Thompson prepared to jump clear and called to his fireman "For God’s sake Joe, jump; we can do no more". Thompson then jumped; Joe, his fireman, did not.

The Irish Mail is thought to have been doing 28–30 mph (45–50 km/h) when it hit the wagons, which were probably travelling at 12–15 mph (20–25 km/h) towards it at impact. The force of the collision derailed the engine, its tender and the leading guard's van. The engine ran on about 30 yards and overturned to the left; the tender overturned to the right and ended up fouling the up line, along which the up (London-bound) Irish Mail was soon due to pass.

However, the heavy loss of life resulting from the accident was caused less by the impact itself, and more by the load of the two runaway wagons next to the brake van, which carried 50 wooden barrels, holding about 1,700 gallons (~7,750 litres) of paraffin oil between them.

Fire, casualties, and Lord Hamilton's testimony 
Some of the barrels broke up in the collision, and their contents caught fire. The engine, tender, guard's van and the first three-passenger carriages were instantly enveloped in dense smoke and flames, which soon spread to the fourth carriage and the front of the leading post office van. This prevented any immediate attempt to rescue the occupants of the first four carriages, who all died, together with the guard in the front guard's van and the locomotive's fireman.

Local farm labourers and quarry workers eventually formed a bucket chain to fetch water from the sea 200 yards (~200 metres) away to put out the fire in these carriages; when they did the victims were found to be burnt beyond recognition, reduced to mere "charred pieces of flesh and bone". Three of them were later identified by their personal effects. The victims were buried in a mass grave in St Michael's churchyard in Abergele, with the London & North Western Railway Company paying all funeral expenses.

The engine driver, Arthur Thompson, survived the collision, but was wounded by flying splinters; he died in October the same year from a pre-existing condition (ulcerated bowels), the inquest upon him concluding that his death had been hastened by his injuries in the accident. The post office workers in the travelling post office escaped, with some of the mail, but the leading post office van was destroyed by fire. There were no deaths or even serious injuries in the carriages behind the post van, and the carriages themselves were successfully detached and saved from the fire.

A first-class passenger, possibly the Marquess of Hamilton, CB, MP, a Lord of the Bedchamber to Albert Edward, Prince of Wales, and/or labourers sent by the surviving guard, ran to Llanddulas to warn of the accident, and the up 'Irish Mail' was successfully held there. Lord Hamilton, the Tory MP for Donegal in Ulster, was the eldest son of His Excellency The 1st Duke of Abercorn, the then Lord Lieutenant of Ireland; Abercorn had only been raised to a dukedom some ten days beforehand. The surviving passengers resumed their journey at 6pm the same day (as did the up 'Irish Mail').

There were more than one dozen casualties part identified, including both The 7th Baron Farnham, KP, an Anglo-Irish peer, and his wife, the Baroness Farnham. Her jewels were found and valued at £6,000. Much coinage gold and silver were melted together from the heat. The deceased were recognised by the artifacts which included two locks from guns, scissors, one Bible and the metalwork from suitcases.

The Railway News said of the incident:

Inquest and prosecutions
At the subsequent inquest, the two brakesmen of the goods train did not give evidence (on legal advice), and the coroner's jury returned a verdict of manslaughter against them. The jury also strongly censured the station-master at Llanddulas for allowing shunting when the express was expected imminently, contrary to the LNWR's rules. The brakesmen were tried for manslaughter at Ruthin assizes the following spring, but acquitted. From contemporary press accounts, at the assizes the judge's charge to the grand jury gave a strong indication that the brakesmen were – or should have been – under the control of a superior officer: the Llanddulas stationmaster.  He then instructed the jury that they should consider if the brakesmen were under the control of the stationmaster, and if there was culpable negligence, whose was the negligence? Despite this the jury returned a true bill, and the brakesmen were tried the next day, the trial jury retiring for less than 10 minutes before returning a verdict of 'Not Guilty'.

Lessons

Railway inspector's report
The Board of Trade inspector, Colonel Frederick Henry Rich, issued his report within a month of the accident. He found that:

 The immediate cause of the accident was the failure of the senior brakesman to apply the individual wagon brakes on the six detached wagons;
 The brake van's brake had been broken by loose shunting of loaded wagons into the six wagons at too high a speed; the secondary cause was the failure of the senior brakesman to moderate their speed by applying wagon brakes, and;
 The station master at Llanddulas was very culpable in not having directed the goods train into the sidings as soon as it arrived at Llanddulas.

However, his analysis went beyond that of the inquest jury; he considered that these failings did not excuse the LNWR, and to some extent were its responsibility.

He then criticised the LNWR on a number of points:
 The section of line was being run on the interval system in a way which was "much to be condemned". The intervals allowed appeared wholly inadequate, particularly for a powerful passenger/mail express being expected to follow a mixed goods working, along a section containing a 1 in 100 gradient – not to mention the need for shunting of goods wagons at Llanddulas to allow the express past. He recommended that on the section in question, and any others like it, "the block telegraph system should be put strictly in force";
 Llanddulas station and Llysfaen sidings had never been inspected by a Government official or been approved by the Board of Trade. They were "quite unfit" to be used at the same time to support both the quarry operations and accommodation of slower trains to allow expresses to pass them. He recommended that an additional siding large enough to accommodate any train being passed should be provided, and kept free from quarry traffic;
 The LNWR "appeared to have a very slack system of supervision", with nobody to look after guards, train them, or monitor their performance;
 Dangerous materials were included in normal goods trains with no greater care taken of them than of other cargoes.  He recommended that they should be sent by separate "special" trains, with additional precautions observed;
 The practice of locking the doors of passenger carriages from the outside. He recommended that all doors be left unlocked.

He then returned to his previous point about what in modern parlance would be "safety culture" and "compliance" issues, but he saw as a simple question of discipline:

He then gave a number of examples, beginning with one which was undeniably relevant:

...before ending:

Catchpoints 
Although this was not one of the recommendations of the Board of Trade report, it became the practice for steep inclines to be fitted with runaway catchpoints so that runaway vehicles would be derailed and stopped before they had a chance to collide with following trains. These catchpoints became widespread, and only diminished in numbers when all rolling stock was fitted with continuous automatic brakes in the 1980s.

Petroleum Act 1879 

Not until 1879 was any legislation passed to regulate the carriage of flammable liquids by rail.

Similar accidents 
Versailles rail accident (1842); wooden carriages which caught fire and cars locked from outside
Stairfoot rail accident (1870)   (see also BoT accident report)
Chelford rail accident (1894)   (see also BoT accident report); only vaguely similar but the accident report quotes LNWR rules on shunting brought in as a result of Abergele

Previous similar but minor accidents on North Wales Coast Line 
 Penmaenmawr (1854)  (BoT accident report)- goods train still shunting when express arrived - express overran 'distant' signal.
 Bangor (1856)   (BoT accident report) - defective interval working - passenger train predictably caught up with goods train - block working recommended.
 Penmaenrhos Tunnel (1859)  (BoT accident report)- defective interval working- light engine predictably caught up with goods train - block working recommended more strongly: covering letter concludes My Lords direct me to call the attention of the directors to the concluding recommendation of the inspecting officer as to the desirableness of working the line by means of the electric telegraph.

See also 
 List of British rail accidents
 Lists of rail accidents

Notes and references

Notes

References

Further reading

External links
BBC site
Newspaper article by author of book in above section

Abergele
Llanddulas and Rhyd-y-Foel
Train collisions in Wales
1868 in Wales
Railway accidents in 1868
Runaway train disasters
Transport in Conwy County Borough
History of Conwy County Borough
Accidents and incidents involving London and North Western Railway
August 1868 events
Train and rapid transit fires
1868 disasters in the United Kingdom